Lichen myxedematosus is a group of cutaneous disorders considered mucinoses.  Conditions included in this group are:

 Generalized lichen myxedematosus
 Localized lichen myxedematosus
 Discrete papular lichen myxedematosus
 Acral persistent papular mucinosis
 Self-healing papular mucinosis
 Self-healing juvenile cutaneous mucinosis
 Papular mucinosis of infancy
 Atypical lichen myxedematosus
 Atypical tuberous myxedema

See also 
 List of cutaneous conditions

References

External links 

Mucinoses